Paraplatypeza atra is a species of fly in the genus Paraplatypeza.

References

Platypezidae
Insects described in 1804